Cantrip is a word of Scots origin to mean a magical spell of any kind, or one which reads the same forwards and backwards. It can also be a witch's trick, or a sham. It is possibly derived from the Gaelic canntaireachd, a piper's mnemonic chant.

In the Dungeons & Dragons role-playing game, it is a type of minor spell that generally is the simplest and weakest kind available to learn. ("Most cantrips are simple little spells of no great effect, so... knowledge and information pertaining to these small magics are discarded in favor of the more powerful spells when available.") The differences, in terms of game mechanics, between cantrips and more powerful spells have changed from edition to edition.

In the trading card game Magic: The Gathering, a cantrip is player jargon to refer to a spell that, in addition to any other effect, makes you draw a card.

In the deck building game Dominion, a cantrip is any Action card that is self-replacing: it both draws you one card and gives you an Action used to play it.

References
 

Incantation